North Londonderry was a county constituency comprising the northern part of County Londonderry.  It was created in 1929, when the House of Commons (Method of Voting and Redistribution of Seats) Act (Northern Ireland) 1929 introduced first-past-the-post elections throughout Northern Ireland. It was created in 1929 as one of five single-member constituencies replacing the former five-member Londonderry constituency. The constituency survived unchanged, returning one member of Parliament until the Parliament of Northern Ireland was temporarily suspended in 1972, and then formally abolished in 1973.

The constituency included the towns of Coleraine, Limavady and Portstewart.

The seat was always held by Ulster Unionist Party candidates, and was rarely contested.

Members of Parliament
 1929–1933: John Martin Mark, Ulster Unionist Party
 1933–1938: Daniel Hall Christie, Ulster Unionist Party
 1938–1958: Robert Moore, Ulster Unionist Party
 1958–1973: Joseph Burns, Ulster Unionist Party

Source:

Election results

At the 1929 Northern Ireland general election, John Martin Mark was elected unopposed.

At the 1933 Northern Ireland general election, Daniel Hall Christie was elected unopposed.

At the 1938 Northern Ireland general election, Robert Moore was elected unopposed.

At the 1949 Northern Ireland general election, Robert Moore was elected unopposed.

At the 1960 North Londonderry by-election, and the 1962 and 1965 Northern Ireland general elections, Joseph Burns was elected unopposed.

Source:

References

Constituencies of the Northern Ireland Parliament
Northern Ireland Parliament constituencies established in 1929
Historic constituencies in County Londonderry
Northern Ireland Parliament constituencies disestablished in 1973